Francesco Caputo was an Italian illuminator and miniaturist painter active  in Naples.

While studying, he showed an inclination to drawing, and became a pupil of the miniaturist Giovanni Battista Rossi. He ended up marrying his daughter. He also illuminated choral manuscripts and bibles for private commissions.

Sources

References

17th-century Italian painters
17th-century Neapolitan people